John Calhoun Phillips (November 13, 1870 – June 25, 1943) was an American politician who served as the third governor of the state of Arizona from January 7, 1929, to January 5, 1931.

Born in 1870 in Vermont, Illinois, Phillips graduated from Hedding College in 1893 and passed the bar in Illinois. He moved to Arizona in 1898 where he practiced private law while at the same time working as a construction worker to earn a living. He helped to build the state capitol building that he would later occupy as governor. He served as a probate judge from 1902 to 1912 before being elected to the Arizona House of Representatives and later, the Arizona Senate.

Phillips became governor in 1929 during the Great Depression. He was instrumental in the creation of a free county library system, the Colorado River Commission, the State Bureau of Criminal Identification and the Arizona Game and Fish Department. During his governorship, he refused to raise the salary for the state judges for political reasons.

Considered an unattractive man with a sense of humor, Phillips referred to himself as "the ugliest man in Arizona." Phillips died in 1943 from a heart attack while fishing on Lake Mary near Flagstaff, Arizona.  He was entombed at Greenwood/Memory Lawn Mortuary & Cemetery in Phoenix.

Sources

 
 Sobel, Robert, and John Raimo, eds. Biographical Directory of the Governors of the United States, 1789–1978, Vol. 1, Westport, Conn.; Meckler Books, 1978. 4 vols.
 Goff, John F. Arizona Biographical Dictionary. Black Mountain Press. Cave Creek, Arizona 1983. p. 263

1870 births
1943 deaths
Republican Party governors of Arizona
People from Vermont, Illinois